Gadkole is a village located in Nizamabad district of Telangana state, India. Gadkole official website is : http://gadkole.website. It is approximately 126.9 km from Hyderabad, the capital city of Telangana. Gadkole is located approximately 38.2 km from its district headquarters Nizamabad.
The main source of income of the villagers is agriculture. Everyone depends on the monsoon. There are no lakes in the village. The nearest famous temple is Sri Lonka RamaLingeswara Swamy, which is located in Deep Forest 5 km from the village. Telangana Grameena bank is located at Avenue Street in the village.  And there are famous Hanuman temples.

References

Villages in Nizamabad district